The 1985 NCAA Women's Golf Championships were contested at the fourth annual NCAA-sanctioned golf tournament to determine the individual and team national champions of women's collegiate golf in the United States. Until 1996, the NCAA would hold just one women's golf championship for all programs across Division I, Division II, and Division III.

The tournament was held again at the Amherst Golf Club in Amherst, Massachusetts.

Florida won the team championship, the Gators' first.

Danielle Ammaccapane, from Arizona State, won the individual title.

Individual results

Individual champion
 Danielle Ammaccapane, Arizona State (298, +6)

Team results

 DC = Defending champion
 Debut appearance

References

NCAA Women's Golf Championship
NCAA Women's Golf Championship
NCAA Women's Golf Championship
Golf in Massachusetts
History of Hampshire County, Massachusetts
NCAA Women's Golf Championship
Sports in Amherst, Massachusetts
Sports competitions in Massachusetts
Tourist attractions in Hampshire County, Massachusetts
Women's sports in Massachusetts